Greetings and Salutations is a 1975 big band jazz album recorded by the Swedish Radio Jazz Group with Thad Jones, Mel Lewis and Jon Faddis as guest bandleader / performers.  The album was nominated for a 1978 Grammy award in the Best Jazz Instrumental Performance - Big Band category.

Track listing
 "61st And Rich'it" – 8:15
 "The Waltz You Swang For Me" – 7:23
 "Forever Lasting" – 6:59
 "Love To One" – 4:19
 "Greetings And Salutations" – 13:37
additional bonus tracks on reissues (from 1977 recording session):	
6. "Mach 2" (Scott) – 4:52
7. "Rhoda's Map" – 5:04
8. "My Centennial" – 9:48

Personnel
Original 1975 recording session (tracks 1~5): 
 Thad Jones – cornet
 Jon Faddis – trumpet
 Americo Bellotto – trumpet
 Bertil Lövgren – trumpet
 Jan Allan – trumpet
 Torgny Nilsson – trombone
 Lars Olofsson – trombone
 Bengt Edwardsson – trombone
 Sven Larson – trombone
 Lennart Åberg – tenor saxophone, soprano saxophone, flute
 Claes Rosendahl – alto saxophone, tenor saxophone, flute
 Erik Nilsson – baritone saxophone, bass clarinet, flute
 Wåge Finer – alto saxophone, tenor saxophone, flute
 Rune Falk – tenor saxophone, clarinet
 Håkan Nyquist – French horn
 Sven Åke Landström – French horn
 Kurt Puke – French horn
 Bengt Olsson – French horn
 Bo Juhlin – tuba
 Rune Gustafsson – guitar
 Bengt Hallberg – piano, electric piano
 Georg Riedel – bass
 Stefan Brolund – electric bass
 Egil Johansen – drums
 Mel Lewis – drums

1977 recording session (bonus tracks 6~8):
 Thad Jones – cornet
 Mel Lewis – drums
 ...
 Al Porcino – trumpet
 Arne Domnérus – reeds
 Bernt Rosengren – reeds
 ...

References 

The Thad Jones/Mel Lewis Orchestra albums
1977 albums